Antioch–Pittsburg station is an unstaffed Amtrak station in Antioch, California and is the closest station to Pittsburg, California, which is located about  west. It is served by San Joaquins trains operating on the branch between Oakland and Bakersfield. The station opened on October 28, 1984, and has a single side platform serving the single track of the BNSF Railway's Stockton Subdivision. The station is also served by Tri Delta Transit, which offers connections to the BART stations in the area. Of the California stations served by Amtrak, Antioch–Pittsburg was the 45th busiest, boarding or detraining 35,345 passengers in Fiscal Year 2018.

History 

The station opened on October 28, 1984 with a single side platform serving the single track of the BNSF Railway's Stockton Subdivision.

A small shelter building was added in December 1990, with an asymmetric teal-colored metal roof supported by concrete pillars. The building was a partially open-sided pavilion with sheltered concrete benches for travelers. The station building included a ticket booth for passenger assistance, but Amtrak's timetables never listed the station as staffed.

By the late 2010s, the shelter became an "area of concern" for Amtrak, the city of Antioch, and the San Joaquin Joint Powers Authority because it was "in a consistent state of disarray due to vandalism and transient use." One particularly notable incident came in 2018 when law enforcement discovered a homeless encampment on the station's roof. Because of that incident, in early September 2019 the shelter structure was demolished and additional landscaping was added in January 2020.

References

External links 

Antioch–Pittsburg Amtrak Station – USA RailGuide (TrainWeb)

Amtrak stations in Contra Costa County, California
Antioch, California
Railway stations in the United States opened in 1984
1984 establishments in California